Bimbo Fatokun (born 13 October 1978) is a Nigerian retired footballer.

Career
Fatokun started his senior career with Royal Antwerp, where he made over one hundred and twenty-two appearances and scored over twenty goals. After that, he played for English club Scarborough Athletic and Belgian clubs K.R.C. Mechelen and KFC Schoten SK before retiring in 2005.

References

External links 
 Seasiders keen on Fatokun return 
 Scarborough's Fatokun grabs late chance 
 "Voor de ploeg is het beter dat ik op de bank zit" 
 "Negen op negen maar een zwarte dag voor Antwerp" 
 The Boys From Festac 
 Fatokun bedreigt Geeraerts met de dood 
 Fatokun behoedt Antwerp voor eerste nederlaag 
 Bimbo Fatokun 
 Fatokun laat kans op strafschoppen liggen 
 Fatokun mag vertrekken bij Antwerp 
 Africa: Bimbo Fatokun Set Join Man Utd 
 Soccer Base Profile

1978 births
Living people
Nigerian footballers
Nigerian expatriate footballers
Expatriate footballers in Belgium
Expatriate footballers in England
Expatriate footballers in Germany
Scarborough Athletic F.C. players
Royal Antwerp F.C. players
Association football forwards